Bobrów may refer to the following places in Poland:
Bobrów in Gmina Miłkowice, Legnica County in Lower Silesian Voivodeship (SW Poland)
Other places called Bobrów (listed in Polish Wikipedia)